Cyana africana is a moth of the family Erebidae. It was described by William Jacob Holland in 1893. It is found in Gabon.

References

Endemic fauna of Gabon
Cyana
Moths described in 1893
Fauna of Gabon
Moths of Africa